China Live is a Chinese marketplace (food hall) in San Francisco, California, described as being of "epic proportions" that comprises various casual (China Live Restaurant) and fine dining restaurants (Eight Tables by George Chen), bars (China Live Bar Central and Cold Drinks Bar), and food and beverage sales, and retail items. China Live was founded by George and Cindy Chen.  George Chen is an entrepreneur, formerly involved in several local landmark restaurants such as Betelnut, Xanadu, and Shanghai 1930, as an effort to "educate" San Francisco on "what real Chinese cuisine is".

China Live was inspired by, and has been compared to, Eataly, a similar establishment based on Italian food.

A branch in Seattle's Denny Triangle neighborhood on the Amazon headquarters campus was announced in February 2020. China Live later delayed the food hall's opening to 2022 and ultimately cancelled its lease due to the COVID-19 pandemic.

References

External links
 China Live | Restaurants In Chinatown | Bars In Chinatown  - China Live Official Website
Fine Dining In San Francisco | San Francisco Fine Dining - Eight Tables by George Chen Official Website
San Francisco’s Eater Awards Winners 2017 - Restaurant of the Year
Eight Tables Is Eater’s Most Beautiful Restaurant of the Year - Most Beautiful Restaurant of the Year
The Most Exciting Restaurant Openings of 2017 - Most Exciting Restaurant Openings of 2017
Bright spots of 2017: The Bay Area's best new bars - The Bay Area's Best New Bars

Economy of San Francisco
2013 establishments in California
Chinese-American culture in California
Supermarkets based in California
American companies established in 2013
Food halls